Belgium competed at the 2008 Summer Olympics in Beijing, People's Republic of China. 96 Belgians took part in Beijing, the biggest delegation for the country since 1976. Belgium won 2 gold medals, better achievement than in 2004, when the country won 1 gold and 2 bronze medals.

Medalists

 Russian team's gold medals were stripped due to anti-doping rules violation by Yulia Chermoshanskaya.

Athletics

Men
Track & road events

Field events

Combined events – Decathlon

Women
Track & road events

Field events

Canoeing 

Qualification Legend: QS = Qualify to semi-final; QF = Qualify directly to final

Cycling

Road
Men

Women

Track
Omnium

Mountain biking

Equestrian

Eventing

Show jumping

Field hockey

Belgium managed to qualify a team to the men's tournament. They won one, drew one, and lost three games in the group play. This qualified them to a match for 9th/10th place, which they won, finishing 9th for the tournament.

Men's tournament

Roster

Group play

9th–10th place

Football

Men's tournament
Roster

Group play

Quarterfinal

Semifinal

Bronze medal game

Gymnastics

Artistic
Men

Women

Judo

Men

Women

Rowing

Men

Qualification Legend: FA=Final A (medal); FB=Final B (non-medal); FC=Final C (non-medal); FD=Final D (non-medal); FE=Final E (non-medal); FF=Final F (non-medal); SA/B=Semifinals A/B; SC/D=Semifinals C/D; SE/F=Semifinals E/F; QF=Quarterfinals; R=Repechage

Sailing

Women

Open

M = Medal race; EL = Eliminated – did not advance into the medal race

Swimming

Men

Women

Table tennis

Tennis 

Men

Triathlon

Volleyball

Weightlifting

See also
 Belgium at the 2008 Summer Paralympics

References

Nations at the 2008 Summer Olympics
2008
Summer Olympics